The Sack of Madurai in 862 was a military expedition led by the Anuradhapura King Sena II, whose army under the command of general Kuttaka, invaded the region of Pandi Nadu and seized Madurai, the capital of the Pandya Empire then ruled by Srimara Srivallabha.

The invasion ended in victory with Varagunavarman II being crowned as the king of Pandyas by general Kuttaka.

Background
War between the Pandya and Anuradhapura kingdoms begun during the reign of Sena I of Anuradhapura. Sena I later, entered negotiations with the Pandyans, and Srimara Srivallabha, who invaded Anuradhapura, left. Pandya was also at war against the Cholas, who made an alliance with the Hoysalas and Eastern Ganga, to defeat the Pandyans led by Srivallabha.

Invasion of Pandya
Sena II, King of Anuradhapura, a royal namesake, invaded the Pandya kingdom in 862 with a powerful naval force. The invading force entered the city of Madurai, and sacked it. Sena II asked the commander of the expeditionaries, Kuttaka, to look for treasures and bring back all the treasures of Anuradhapura taken by the Srimara Srīvallabha's forces. The forces of Sena II allied with a Tamil rebel leader named, Varagunavarman. Srimara Srīvallabha was handling a Pallava invasion from the North. Despite this, the invasion from the southern flank caused him to flee to the North, however he died in warfare.

Varagunavarman II was crowned as king of Pandya by Kuttaka. After touring the Pandya country, Kuttaka returned to Anuradhapura with the treasure of Madurai.

References

Wars involving Sri Lanka
Overseas empires
Kingdom of Anuradhapura
Madurai
Invasions of India